Sōichi, Soichi, Souichi or Sohichi (written: 壮一, 宗一, 聡一, 奏一 or そういち in hiragana) is a masculine Japanese given name. Notable people with the name include:

 (born 1942), Japanese politician
 (born 1972), Japanese baseball player
Soichi Ichida (1910–1986), Japanese philatelist
 (1886–1947), Japanese mathematician
, Japanese manga artist
 (born 1965), Japanese astronaut
 (1900–1970), Japanese journalist
 (1885-1971), Japanese-American photographer
 (born 1989), Japanese footballer
 (born 1965), Japanese composer

Japanese masculine given names